Expertization is the process of authentication of an object, usually of a sort that is collected, by an individual authority or a committee of authorities. The expert, or expert committee, examines the collectible and issues a certificate typically including:

 A statement of:
 Whether or not the item is authentic
 Identification of any damage to the item
 Identification of any repairs to the item
 Identification of any forgery or faked parts of the item
 A photo of the item

Some experts apply a mark or signature to the item attesting its genuineness.

Expertization is particularly common with valuable philatelic items, some of which are so often forged that they may be unsaleable without it.

See also
Philatelic expertization

Authentication methods
Skills
Art history
Valuation (finance)

bg:Експертиза
de:Expertise
fr:Expertise
it:Estimo
nl:Expertise